The Titanic Memorial is a  lighthouse at Fulton and Pearl Streets in the Financial District of Lower Manhattan in New York City. Its design incorporates the use of a time ball.

History 
The lighthouse was originally erected by public subscription in 1913. It stood above the East River on the roof of the old Seamen's Church Institute of New York and New Jersey at the corner of South Street and Coenties Slip. From 1913 to 1967 the time ball at the top of the lighthouse would drop down the pole to signal twelve noon to the ships in the harbor. This time ball mechanism was activated by a telegraphic signal, from the Naval Observatory in Washington, D.C.

In July 1968 the Seamen's Church Institute moved to 15 State Street. That year, the Titanic Memorial Lighthouse was donated by the Kaiser-Nelson Steel & Salvage Corporation to the South Street Seaport Museum. It was erected at the entrance to the museum complex, on the corner of Fulton and Pearl streets, in May 1976, with funds provided by the Exxon Corporation.

In 2017, preservation efforts were initiated due to the state of the lighthouse under the auspices of Friends of Titanic Lighthouse Restoration, which was founded in 2019 and whose members include descendants of those aboard the Titanic. Plans under discussion as of 2022 include a potential Titanic museum on Pier 16, but restoration does not have the support of the museum.

Other memorials 
Additional memorials exist in Canada, England, Northern Ireland, and Washington, D.C.

References

External links 

 

1913 establishments in New York City
Government buildings in Manhattan
Lighthouses completed in 1913
Lighthouses in New York City
RMS Titanic memorials
South Street Seaport
Time balls
Transportation buildings and structures in Manhattan